Eaton Regional Education Service Agency (formerly called Eaton Intermediate School District) includes portions of Eaton County, Barry County, Ionia County, and Ingham County in Michigan, United States. Its offices are located in Charlotte, Eaton County, Michigan.

School districts
 Charlotte Public Schools
 Eaton Rapids Public Schools
 Grand Ledge Public Schools
 Maple Valley Schools
 Oneida Strange Township School District 3
 Potterville Community Schools

Former school districts

 Bellevue Community Schools
 Olivet Community Schools
 Roxand Township School District 12
 Waverly Community Schools

Schools
 Early On (group and home based services)
 Great Start Readiness Program Classrooms (located at local school districts)
 Eaton Great Start (located at Southridge Facility)
 Career Preparation Center (located at LCC West Campus)
 Meadowview Offsite (Special Education) (located at local school districts)
 Meadowview School (Special Education) (located at Eaton RESA Packard Facility)
 Meadowview Post Secondary Transition Program (located downtown Charlotte)

References

External links
 District website

School districts in Michigan
Education in Eaton County, Michigan
Education in Barry County, Michigan
Education in Ionia County, Michigan
Education in Ingham County, Michigan